"Welcome Home" is a song by progressive rock band Coheed and Cambria, released on September 20, 2005 through Columbia Records. It is the third track on the album, Good Apollo, I'm Burning Star IV, Volume One: From Fear Through the Eyes of Madness. The song was the first single on the album and was made into a music video. The song tells of the hostility in The Writer and Miss Erica Court's relationship in The Amory Wars, according to bandleader Claudio Sanchez. It reached #24 on the Mainstream Rock chart. A 7" version backed by a live-version of "The Crowing" and sold with the album.

The song was featured as a playable track in the game Rock Band, as well as the soundtrack of the Xbox 360 version of Madden NFL 06. It was also the official theme of the re-branded version of NXT between June 2012 and February 2014. It was also included in the trailers of the animated movie 9.

Track listing

Inclusion in Rock Band
In 2007, this song was included in the Harmonix music video game Rock Band, exposing Coheed and Cambria to a considerably wider audience. However, the words "whore" and "fucking" were edited to "wolf" and "mucking" respectively. The conclusion of the song was also edited, replacing the fade-out and the strings with a short guitar solo as the player earns the ending bonus points.

Ghetts' "Menace" 
British grime and rap MC Ghetts' track "Menace" samples the "Welcome Home" riff. "Menace" appeared as track 5 on his 2007 debut studio album, "Ghetto Gospel," when the artist was still known as Ghetto. "Menace" was produced by fellow The Movement MC and producer, Scorcher. The song "was widely accepted in the UK by Grime fans and seen as one of [Ghetts'] classics."

Charts

References

External links
 Coheed and Cambria official website

Coheed and Cambria songs
2005 singles
2005 songs
Columbia Records singles